The men's 1500 metre freestyle competition of the swimming events at the 2011 World Aquatics Championships was held on July 30 with the heats and the semifinals and July 31 with the final.

Record
Prior to the competition, the existing world and championship record were as follows.

The following record was established during the competition:

Results

Heats
27 swimmers participated in 4 heats.

Final
The final was held at 18:49.

References

External links
2011 World Aquatics Championships: Men's 1500 metre freestyle entry list, from OmegaTiming.com; retrieved 2011-07-23.

Freestyle 1500 metre, men's
World Aquatics Championships